

 is a neighborhood in the city of Musashino in Western Tokyo, Japan. It is centered on a compact but popular commercial area to the north and south of Kichijoji Station, with a full range of shops, restaurants, bars, and coffee houses. The area is a popular center for shopping and leisure in the Tokyo metropolitan area due in part to its close proximity to Inokashira Park and Inokashira Park Zoo. 

Kichijoji has been voted the number 1 place in Japan that Japanese would like to live every year since the 1990s according to polls by the magazine CNN GO. Kichijōji Station is served by the Chūō Line which runs to Tokyo Central Station in around 30 minutes, the Sobu Line, the Tozai Line and is also a terminus of the Keiō Inokashira Line, which takes passengers as far as Shibuya in around 20 minutes on the express service.

History 
This town was named after the Kichijō-ji Temple which was located in Bunkyō City, Tokyo, before being destroyed by fire in the year 1657.  This temple, in turn, derived its name from the Hindu goddess Lakshmi, corresponding to Kisshōten in Japan.

During the Great fire of Meireki, the town in front of Suwazan Kichijō-ji Temple gate, Edo's Hongo Motomachi (now: Hongō 1-chome, Bunkyō, near Suidōbashi Station) was destroyed by fire.  Afterwards, based on town planning, the shogunate rebuilt the area for daimyō residences.  Since the residents who used to live in front of Kichijo-ji gate had suffered great loss of residence and farm land, the shogunate's official reed lands named "Reno" and "Mureno" were provided as substitute land for them.  Those hoping to apply were given a rice stipend and house construction loans with a 5 year limit.  Kichijo-ji samurai, Sato Sadaemon and Miyazaki Jinemon, in cooperation with local farmer Matsui Jurozaemon, opened up the eastern district of present day Musashino and relocated the residents there.

Soon after, with the opening of the Tamagawa Aqueduct, the previously poorly watered uninhabited Musashino Plateau was cultivated, turning it into a vast farmland.  In the process, the neatly partitioned thin rectangular shaped plots of land along Itsukaichi Kaidō (ja) (currently Tokyo Metropolitan Route 7, Suginami Akiruno Line) were formed.  Some migrants were granted great lengths of land of more than 1000 meters long in the land area extending from Itsukaichi Kaidō to the Tamagawa Aqueduct, up to where the Senkawa Aqueduct (ja) divides.  But the soil was not particularly fertile, so all of the farmland became dry soil fields, with no wet rice fields.  Because of the residents who still had attachment to the former Kichijo-ji, the new fields were named Kichijōji Village.

Economy 
The neighborhood is dominated by a shopping district centered on a covered street, Sun Road, which extends north from Kichijōji Station. This well organized and clean area includes amenities, shops, entertainment and restaurants.

Halfway up this shopping street is the Buddhist temple Gessō-ji (月窓寺), with graveyard, and at the northern end of it are Shinto shrines, the latter holding the occasional festival, with amusements such as fishing for gold fish, sweet food stalls, and typical dishes.

On the north, east, and south sides of the station is a large nightlife area with many restaurants, bars, izakaya, and "live" houses. On the north-east side of the station lies a red-light district on the Chūō Line between Tachikawa and Shinjuku, containing numerous cabarets, bars, and pink salons.

The anime and manga companies Coamix and Bee Train have their headquarters in Kichijōji. Studio Ghibli was previously located in Kichijōji.

Inokashira Park 

Inokashira Park, the source of the Kanda River (神田川 Kanda-gawa), is located south of Kichijōji Station, and is a favorite spot for springtime hanami, or cherry-blossom viewing. Public-opinion surveys consistently designate Kichijōji one of Tokyo's most desirable residential neighborhoods. It features a large center lake, petting zoo, small cafes, food vendors, and street performers around the perimeter of the park. Nearby is the Ghibli Museum, which is part of the neighboring city Mitaka.

Education 
Seikei University (成蹊大学) is a private university in the northwestern area of the district. It is part of a wider educational institute—an escalator school—which teaches from elementary school right through to university level, and is situated amongst rows of large trees in that area of Kichijōji.

Little Angels International School, a private international school, previously had a campus in Kichijōji.

Axis International School is a private school accepting children from the age of 1 to the second year of university.

Kichijōji in popular culture 
Kichijōji is often portrayed in a variety of television shows, motion pictures, literature, and other media.

Video games
 Shin Megami Tensei: The protagonist lives in Kichijōji along with his mom and his dog.
 First Kiss Story: The town in which the game takes place is modeled after Kichijōji.
 Persona 5: Inokashira Park is one of the hangout spots in the game. In the Royal edition, Kichijōji is added as a fully explorable area allowing players to visit popular spots such as Sun Road, Harmonica Yokocho (alley) and Daiyagai mall.
 NG: Visual novel game for PS Vita and PS4 taking place in Kissōji, a fictional town based on Kichijōji.

Anime
Kujibiki Unbalance
Ocean Waves: The first and last scene of the film take place at Kichijōji station.
Code-E
Ultimate Girls (1st episode)
Full Metal Panic? Fumoffu: "Uncontrollable Bluebird"
Yawara! (14th episode)
Maria-sama ga Miteru
Aura Battler Dunbine: The main protagonist lives in Kichijōji.
Genma Wars
Megazone 23
To Love-Ru
DD Fist of the North Star
Tesagure! Bukatsu-mono
Happy Jozy: A comedic family of Americans experience life in Japan taking place in Kichijōji.
Occultic;Nine
Brothers Conflict (Noticeable in episode 1)
 Shirobako

Manga
Kichijōji Catwalk
Tokyo Tribes (Santa Inoue)
Fourteen (Kazuo Umezu)
Nantoka Narudesho! (Hisashi Eguchi)
Cher Gou Gou ... Mon Petit Chat, Mon Petit Ami (Yumiko Ōshima)
I"s (Masakazu Katsura)
Video Girl Ai (Masakazu Katsura)
Ellie My Love (Mako Takami)
Itazura na Kiss (Kaoru Tada)
Kodoku no Gourmet
Restore Garage 251 (Ryuji Tsugihara)
Kichijōji Gang (Sachiko Nagahama)
Café Kichijōji de
Great Teacher Onizuka (Toru Fujisawa)
Cat's Eyes (2010) 
Chūō-sen Drops (Natsuo Motomachi)
Rokudenashi Blues (Masanori Morita)
Sgt. Frog (Mine Yoshizaki)
Is Kichijōji the Only Place to Live? (Hirochi Maki)
Hinako Note (Mitsuki)

Film
Sebastian (Sōkichi Miyata)
Amacchoroi Love Song (Sōkichi Miyata)
The Mirage Flowers (Tadaaki Horai)
Sayonara Kēki to Fushigina Ranpu (Jun'ichi Kanai)
Kichijōji no Asahina-kun (Shōichi Katō)
Rinjō (Hajime Hashimoto)
Parks (Natsuki Seta)

Gallery

References

External links 

 
 Official site of the City of Musashino 

Entertainment districts in Japan
Neighborhoods of Tokyo
Musashino, Tokyo